Alistair D. Brown (born 29 March 1957) was a Scottish footballer who played most of his 'senior' career with Dumbarton.  After ten years as a permanent fixture in the Dumbarton line-up, he moved to Stirling Albion.

References

1957 births
Scottish footballers
Dumbarton F.C. players
Stirling Albion F.C. players
Scottish Football League players
Living people
Place of birth missing (living people)
Association football forwards